In Native American mythology, the Fastachee is a small dwarf known as the "Little Giver", who provides corn and medicine. The story is told in the Southeast Woodlands, Seminole and Oklahoma.

Legendary creatures of the indigenous peoples of North America
Seminole culture